The 2007 North–South Summit Declaration is the declaration for the development of inter-Korean relations and peace and prosperity. It is the declaration agreed upon between South Korea's 16th president Roh Moo-hyun and North Korea's representative Kim Jong Il at the 2007 inter-Korean summit. It is often called the 10.4 South-North Summit Declaration or the 2007 North-South Summit Declaration, and it is also referred to as the 10.4 Declaration. On October 4, 2007, at 1 pm, the North and South Korean leaders signed jointly at the Paekhwawon State Guesthouse, Pyongyang.

Summary 

1. The South and the North shall uphold and endeavor actively to realize the June 15
Declaration.
The South and the North have agreed to resolve the issue of unification on their own
initiative and according to the spirit of “by-the-Korean-people-themselves.”
The South and the North will work out ways to commemorate the June 15 anniversary of
the announcement of the South-North Joint Declaration to reflect the common will to
faithfully carry it out.

2. The South and the North have agreed to firmly transform inter-Korean relations into
ties of mutual respect and trust, transcending the differences in ideology and systems.
The South and the North have agreed not to interfere in the internal affairs of the other
and agreed to resolve inter-Korean issues in the spirit of reconciliation, cooperation and
reunification. 

3. The South and the North have agreed to closely work together to put an end to military
hostilities, mitigate tensions and guarantee peace on the Korean Peninsula.
The South and the North have agreed not to antagonize each other, reduce military
tension, and resolve issues in dispute through dialogue and negotiation. 

4. The South and the North both recognize the need to end the current armistice regime
and build a permanent peace regime. The South and the North have also agreed to work
together to advance the matter of having the leaders of the three or four parties directly
concerned to convene on the Peninsula and declare an end to the war. 

5. The South and the North have agreed to facilitate, expand, and further develop inter-Korean
economic cooperation projects on a continual basis for balanced economic
development and co-prosperity on the Korean Peninsula in accordance with the principles
of common interests, co-prosperity and mutual aid.

See also
Sunshine policy
Inter-Korean summit 2007 summit
Unconverted long-term prisoners, communists imprisoned by South Korea
Ten Point Programme for Reunification of the Country

References

 South-North Joint Declaration, June 15, 2000 (United States Institute of Peace)
 kcckp.net Naenara Webpage
 Text of Korean Armistice Agreement

External links

Article from "By our nation by itself" 

North Korea–South Korea relations
2000 in North Korea
2000 in South Korea
2000 in international relations
2000 documents
June 2000 events in Asia
June 2000 events in South Korea